Neasham Belle (1948 – November 1971) was a British Thoroughbred racehorse and broodmare best known for winning the classic Oaks Stakes in 1951. After winning one minor race as a two-year-old, she was well-beaten in her first two races in 1951 before recording an upset win in the Oaks. She was beaten in her only subsequent race and was retired to stud, where she made little impact as a broodmare.

Background
Neasham Belle was a bay mare with no white markings bred by her owner, Major Lionel Brook Holliday. She was sired by the Italian stallion Nearco, one of the most important sires of the 20th century. Her dam, Phase, also produced the successful racehorse and sire Narrator, and was the female-line ancestor of Hethersett.

Holliday sent his filly into training with Major Geoffrey Brooke at his Clarehaven Stables near Newmarket.

Racing career

1950: two-year-old season
Neasham Belle ran three times as a two-year-old in 1950 winning one minor race at Doncaster Racecourse. She started favourite for the Windsor Castle Stakes at Royal Ascot but ran poorly.

1951: three-year-old season
On her three-year-old debut, Neasham Belle finished unplaced behind Belle of All in 1000 Guineas over the Rowley Mile course at Newmarket. The filly was then moved up in distance for the Lingfield Oaks Trial over one and a half miles. She finished third, beaten a neck and three lengths by Chinese Cracker and Sea Parrot.

On 1 June Neasham Belle was one of sixteen fillies to contest the Oaks over one and a half miles at Epsom. The race attracted a crowd estimated at 100,000 which included the future Queen Elizabeth II. She was given little chance and started at odds of 33/1. Ridden by Stan Clayton she won the classic by four lengths from Chinese Cracker, with Belle of All two lengths back in third.

On her only subsequent appearance, Neasham Belle finished unplaced behind Sea Parrot in the Yorkshire Oaks in August.

Assessment
In their book A Century of Champions, based on a modified version of the Timeform system John Randall and Tony Morris rated Neasham Belle an “average” winner of the Oaks.

Stud career
Neasham Belle was retired to stud where she produced two minor winners- Magnifier, sired by Mark-Ye-Well and First Grey, by Roan Rocket. She died in November 1971.

Pedigree

References

1948 racehorse births
1971 racehorse deaths
Racehorses bred in the United Kingdom
Racehorses trained in the United Kingdom
Thoroughbred family 21-a
Epsom Oaks winners